Enteromius bigornei is a species of ray-finned fish in the genus Enteromius, it is only found in Little Scarcies basin in Sierra Leone, western Côte d'Ivoire, and eastern Liberia.

The fish is named in honor of Rémy Bigorne (b. 1954), an ichthyologist, of ORSTOM (Office de la Recherche Scientifique et Technique d’Outre-Mer).

Footnotes 

 

Enteromius
Taxa named by Christian Lévêque
Taxa named by Guy G. Teugels
Taxa named by Thys van den Audenaerde
Fish described in 1988